Andrew Lees may refer to:
Andrew Lees (environmentalist) (1949–1994), scientist and environmentalist
Andrew Lees (neurologist) (born 1947), English neurologist
Andrew Lees (vaccinologist) (born 1953), American biochemist
Andrew Lees (rugby union) (born 1979), Australian rugby union referee
Andrew Lees (actor) (born 1985), Australian actor

See also
Andrew Lee (disambiguation)